"All These Things That I've Done" is a song by American rock band the Killers. The song was released as the third single from the band's debut studio album, Hot Fuss (2004), on August 30, 2004. It was written by frontman Brandon Flowers and features gospel choir The Sweet Inspirations. The song is about television host Matt Pinfield, and his work with the U.S. Army, as part of a program that mentored wounded/PTSD-stricken soldiers returning from Iraq.

"All These Things That I've Done" was released as the third single from Hot Fuss in 2004 in the United Kingdom and as the fourth single in the United States and Australia in 2005, peaking at number 74 on the US Billboard Hot 100, number 42 on the Australian ARIA Charts and number 18 on the UK Singles Chart. The song features the central lyric of "You gotta help me out," and an extended refrain of "I got soul, but I'm not a soldier."

Background
The song is about television host Matt Pinfield. Before the Killers were famous, Pinfield, who was a vice president of A&R at Columbia Records at the time, tried to sign the band. He was also working with the U.S. Army as part of a program that mentored wounded or PTSD-stricken musician soldiers returning from Iraq. After visiting veteran soldiers in Colorado City, he went to Las Vegas, where he quickly bonded with the Killers. Pinfield watched the band rehearse at drummer Ronnie Vannucci's garage and took them out to dinner. He asked if anybody wanted to give him a ride back to his hotel and Brandon Flowers offered to drive Pinfield. They wound up hitting the bar at the Gold Coast Hotel on a Tuesday night, just "talking about life", Pinfield said:

In 2016, Pinfield titled his memoir All These Things That I've Done: My Insane, Improbable Rock Life. On January 19, 2019, the band gave Pinfield a shoutout while introducing the song at the iHeartRadio ALTer Ego 2019 festival at The Forum in Inglewood, California, where Pinfield was in attendance in a wheelchair still recovering from being hit by a car a month before.

Critical reception 
The song was acclaimed by critics upon release. Bill Lamb of About.com gave the song 4 out of 5 stars, noting its strength as a pop-rock anthem. Jemma Volp-Fletcher gave the single a perfect score of 10 out of 10, calling it "staggering", while also complimenting frontman Flowers' songwriting skills. musicOMH's Sara McDonnell was also impressed, saying that it had "classic song' written all over it".

In 2009, The Daily Telegraph listed it among the "100 Greatest Songs of All Time".

In 2020, Paste ranked the song number two on their list of the 20 greatest Killers songs, and in 2021, American Songwriter ranked the song number six on their list of the 10 greatest Killers songs.

In December 2005, the song was nominated for Best Rock Performance by a Duo or Group with Vocal at the 48th Grammy Awards, but lost to "Sometimes You Can't Make It on Your Own" by U2.

Performances and covers 
The band performed the song at Live 8, a charity campaign series of concerts held in July 2005. In 2009, the Killers, Coldplay, Bono (U2), and Gary Barlow (Take That) performed the track together to support a special War Child concert following the BRIT Awards.

Fellow Las Vegas band Panic! At the Disco members Brendon Urie and Ryan Ross slow danced to the song according to the December 2006 issue of Kerrang!.

A popular song among alternative rock bands, "All These Things That I've Done" has been covered live by numerous artists including U2, Coldplay, Imagine Dragons, Walk the Moon, Kris Allen, and Robbie Williams.

Music videos 
The song has two music videos, the earlier of which was filmed in July 2004. It features the Killers singing while walking down Brick Lane, in London accompanied by a crowd. The video also featured shots of the audience who attended the Killers concert at the London Astoria, on July 8, 2004.

The later version which served as promotion for airing where released as the fourth single in the United States and Australia, directed by Dutch photographer Anton Corbijn, was filmed in May 2005 in Las Vegas and features a surreal, dream-like sequence, where the Killers, dressed as cowboys, are attacked by scantily clad female warriors armed with boomerangs. The story in the video is told out of order, but can be put in its order by the numbers displayed in the video. The band later made use of a similar cowboy motif during promotion of their second album, Sam's Town, and its accompanying tour and music videos during 2006 and 2007.

Accolades

Awards

Track listings 
All songs were written by Brandon Flowers except where noted.

UK 7-inch single
A. "All These Things That I've Done" (album version)
B. "Andy, You're a Star" (Zane Lowe Radio 1 session)

UK CD single
 "All These Things That I've Done" (album version)
 "Why Don't You Find Out for Yourself" (Zane Lowe Radio 1 session) 
 "All These Things That I've Done" (radio edit)
 "All These Things That I've Done" (enhanced video)

European CD single
 "All These Things That I've Done" (radio edit) – 3:50
 "All These Things That I've Done" (album version) – 5:01

Australian and New Zealand CD single
 "All These Things That I've Done" (radio edit) – 3:50
 "All These Things That I've Done" (album version) – 5:01
 "Mr. Brightside" (The Lindbergh Palace club remix)  – 8:22
 "All These Things That I've Done" (video)

Charts and certifications

Charts

Certifications

Release history

In other media 
The song is mimed to by Justin Timberlake in a drug induced dream sequence in the 2006 Richard Kelly movie Southland Tales.
Comedian and musician Bill Bailey frequently pokes fun at the song's refrain during his shows, providing his own version: "I've got ham, but I'm not a hamster". According to Bailey himself, the band was aware of the parody, finding it quite amusing. The song has also been featured in commercials, including an ad for Nike.

The song was used in a trailer for The Secret Life of Pets 2.

Also used in the 2005 film, THE MATADOR, with Greg Kinnear

References 

2000s ballads
2005 singles
Anti-war songs
Black-and-white music videos
Island Records singles
The Killers songs
Music videos directed by Anton Corbijn
Protest songs
Rock ballads
Songs written by Brandon Flowers